Workers' Front may refer to one of the following:
 Workers' Left Front, Argentina
 Botswana Workers Front
 Workers' Front of Catalonia
 Workers' Front (Croatia)
 Galician Workers Front
 Workers Front for Indochina
 Socialist Workers Front (Marxist–Leninist), Panama